Pepper Creek may refer to:

Pepper Creek (Delaware), a river in Delaware, United States
Pepper Creek, Texas, a town in Texas, United States